James Mulholland may refer to:
 Jakes Mulholland,  former U.S. soccer defender
 James Mulholland (composer), American composer
 James Mulholland, member of the British band The KBC
 James Mulholland (Latter Day Saints), co-author of the Latter Day Saints document History of the Church
 James Allan Mulholland, Pioneer Corps officer and Member of the Order of the British Empire
 James Mulholland, Representative, British Council, Sierra Leone, 1978 and Officer of the Order of the British Empire